Paasamalargal is a 1994 Indian Tamil-language romantic drama film directed by Suresh Chandra Menon. The film stars Arvind Swamy and Revathi. It was released on 4 February 1994.

Plot 

In order to earn the goodwill, a businessman adopts six orphan girls who are in good touch with him. After the initial friction, he does warm up to them. Meanwhile, a young girl a colleague falls in love with him. All goes well but a tragedy strikes in the end.

Cast 

Arvind Swamy as Raj
Revathi as Asha
Srividya
M. N. Nambiar
Chinni Jayanth
Deepa Venkat as Jhanvi
Niroopa as Niroopa
Ajith Kumar as Kumar
Gayathri Shastry
Shree Durga
Priyanka
Swathi
Raghuvaran in a guest appearance
Sukumari in a guest appearance

Production 
Ajith Kumar was selected in the film after he had appeared in a television advertisement shot by P. C. Sreeram for Suresh Menon's company. Vikram dubbed the scenes for Ajith for the second time after Amaravathi (1993).

Soundtrack 
The music was composed by V. S. Narasimhan, with lyrics by Vairamuthu.

Release and reception 
Paasamalargal was released on 4 February 1994. Writing for The Indian Express, Malini Mannath called it "a decent wholesome family entertainer". Thulasi of Kalki found the cinematography and music as the film's positive points.

References

External links 
 

1990s Tamil-language films
1994 films
1994 romantic drama films
Films scored by V. S. Narasimhan
Indian romantic drama films